Ahmadi (also Romanized as Aḩmadī; also known as Ahmad, Aḩmadī-ye Sar Boneh, Aḩmadī-ye Sarneh, and Aḩmadī-ye Saroneh) is a village in Sarbanan Rural District, in the Central District of Zarand County, Kerman Province, Iran. At the 2006 census, its population was 395, in 101 families.

References 

Populated places in Zarand County